Theale railway station serves the village of Theale, Berkshire, England.

History

Layout
Theale has three platforms. Platforms 1 and 2 serve the up and down main line, and platform 3 is a former goods loop upgraded to passenger standards in 2011. 

Plans to upgrade facilities at the station were announced in 2013 by Network Rail and GWR (including new lifts, a new pedestrian entrance and accessible footbridge, extra car parking, and a new ticket office), but the £2.9 million project has been delayed several times and by summer 2016 was running more than three years behind schedule. The upgrade project was resumed in 2021.

Services
The typical off-peak service at the station in trains per hour is:
 1 tph to London Paddington
 1 tph to 
 1 tph to 
 1 tph to

References

External links

Railway stations in Berkshire
DfT Category E stations
Former Great Western Railway stations
Railway stations in Great Britain opened in 1847
Railway stations served by Great Western Railway
1847 establishments in England